Snag is a village located on a small, dry-weather sideroad off the Alaska Highway,  east of Beaver Creek, Yukon, Canada. The village of Snag is located in a bowl-shaped valley of the White River and its tributaries, including Snag Creek. It was first settled during the Klondike Gold Rush. It was the site of a military airfield, established as part of the Northwest Staging Route, which closed in 1968. In 1947, the village of Snag boasted a population of eight to ten First Nation people and fur traders. An additional staff of fifteen to twenty airport personnel — meteorologists, radio operators, aircraft maintenance men — lived at the airport barracks.

Climate
Snag has a subarctic climate (Köppen climate classification Dwc/Dfc) with mild summers and severely cold and long winters.

On February 3, 1947, the record-low temperature for continental North America was recorded in Snag: . That same winter, two previous records had already been surpassed: one in December noted various phenomena, particularly sound such as voices being heard clearly miles from their source. There was a clear sky (except for some ice fog), and little to no wind.

Disappearance of aircraft

On January 26, 1950, a Douglas C-54 Skymaster (tail number 42-72469) of the United States Air Force, with 34 service personnel, 2 civilians and a crew of 8, disappeared on a flight from Alaska to Montana. It was in the vicinity of Snag when last contact was made by radio at 17:09. No wreckage or remains have ever been located.

References

Ghost towns in Yukon